Iga Świątek is the defending champion.

Seeds 
All seeds received a bye into the second round.

Draw

Finals

Top half

Section 1

Section 2

Section 3

Section 4

Bottom half

Section 5

Section 6

Section 7

Section 8

Seeded players 
The following are the seeded players. Seedings are based on WTA rankings as of March 6, 2023. Rankings and points before are as of March 20, 2023.

† The player was not required to count points for the 2022 tournament due to a long-term injury exception. Points from her 16th best result will be deducted instead.
‡ The player did not qualify for the main draw in 2022. Points from her 16th best result will be deducted instead.

Other entry information

Wildcards

Protected ranking

Withdrawals 
 Before the tournament

Qualifying

Seeds

Qualifiers

Qualifying draw

First qualifier

Second qualifier

Third qualifier

Fourth qualifier

Fifth qualifier

Sixth qualifier

Seventh qualifier

Eighth qualifier

Ninth qualifier

Tenth qualifier

Eleventh qualifier

Twelfth qualifier

References

External links 
 Main draw
 Qualifying draw

2023 WTA Tour
Singles women